Vincenzo Oliveri (born 3 February 1963) is an Italian-born celebrity chef who specialises in Italian cuisine. He was born in Palermo in the  region of Sicily. He has been a resident of the United Kingdom since moving to England in 1990. Better known as Enzo Oliveri or "The Sicilian Chef".

Representing today the federation Italian Chefs [FIC] in the United Kingdom, 
Oliveri is on the board on the International Hospitality Council [IHC] and is Judge of the Italian National Young Chefs and Young Chef Olympiad [YCO] in India. Oliveri has also worked with several Italian companies and brands, firstly with Fratelli La Bufala UK, and was the keener of more than six restaurants and of a kitchen school in Bromley, London.

Oliveri is the official Executive Chef to the Italian National Cycling team and Alitalia UK.

He made a great contribution to the spread of Italian cuisine in England and can be seen at work in the Channel 4 programme "Kitchen Impossible" with Chef Michel Roux Jr and together with the Italian chef Aldo Zilli. In the series "Sicily with Aldo & Enzo", on another British Television, he is also a good friend of another celebrity chef, Gordon Ramsey. They appeared on Channel 4 together for F Word in Go Octopus Hunting in Sicily. Oliveri has also worked with Paul Hollywood for City Bakers on the Food  Newtwork.
Oliveri is now chef patron at Tasting Sicily Enzo's Kitchen in Piccadilly.
Enzo Oliveri has been Awarded by the President of Italy, the honorary Cavaliere Ufficiale OSI, the equivalent of the English MBE form the work done has an Ambassador of Italy in the World true Hospitality Food and Culture.

External links

Vincenzo Olivieri Interview
Kitchen Impossible - Michel Roux Jr
 Magazine Interview
Gordon Ramsey and Vincenzo Oliveri on Channel 4

1963 births
British chefs
Italian chefs
Italian expatriates in the United Kingdom
Living people